Love's Jazz and Art Center is located at 2510 North 24th Street in the Near North Omaha neighborhood of Omaha, Nebraska. Founded and named to honor of Omaha jazz great Preston Love, Love's highlights the African American culture of North Omaha. In addition to sponsoring a variety of events, Love's has hosted events for Native Omaha Days.

See also 

 History of North Omaha, Nebraska
 Music in Omaha, Nebraska
 Culture of Omaha, Nebraska

References

External links 
 Official website

Music of Omaha, Nebraska
Museums in Omaha, Nebraska
African-American museums in Nebraska
African-American history in Omaha, Nebraska
Arts centers in Nebraska